Oliver Morgan (May 6, 1933 - July 31, 2007) was an American R&B singer. A Louisiana Music Hall of Fame inductee, he is best known for his 1964 hit, "Who Shot the Lala".

Life and career
Morgan was born and raised in the Lower Ninth Ward of New Orleans, Louisiana, alongside Fats Domino, Jesse Hill and Smiley Lewis.

In 1961, he released his debut single on AFO Records under the pseudonym "Nookie Boy." It was in 1964 that he released his only national hit "Who Shot the La La" which sings about the mysterious situation surrounding the death of singer Lawrence "Prince La La" Nelson in 1963. The recording session took place at Cosimo Matassa's studio in New Orleans with Eddie Bo at the piano. Following the success of the song, he went on a tour nationally, but eventually settled as a local singer appearing at local clubs in addition to the New Orleans Jazz Festival. He also had a day job working as a custodian at City Hall and as the caretaker of the New Orleans Pharmacy Museum on Chartres Street.

In 1998, he released his first and only full-length album I'm Home from Allen Toussaint's Nyno label. Toussaint gave him full support providing 5 of the 10 songs and producing and playing on the album. Morgan's Lower Ninth Ward home was destroyed in the aftermath of Hurricane Katrina, and he evacuated to Atlanta, Georgia with his wife where their children were living. Morgan died from a heart attack in Atlanta on July 31, 2007. He had not performed since he evacuated out of New Orleans.

References

External links
 Oliver Morgan's biography on Nyno Records

1933 births
2007 deaths
Rhythm and blues musicians from New Orleans
American rhythm and blues musicians
Singers from Louisiana
20th-century African-American male singers